Komarivka may refer to several places in Ukraine:

Cherkasy Oblast
 Komarivka, Korsun-Shevchenkivskyi Raion, village in Korsun-Shevchenkivskyi Raion
 Komarivka, Zolotonosha Raion, village in Zolotonosha Raion

Chernihiv Oblast
 Komarivka, Nizhyn Raion, Chernihiv Oblast, village in Nizhyn Raion
 Komarivka, Pryluky Raion, Chernihiv Oblast, village in Pryluky Raion
 Komarivka, Koriukivka Raion, Chernihiv Oblast, village in Koriukivka Raion
 Komarivka, Chernihiv Raion, Chernihiv Oblast, village in Chernihiv Raion

Crimea
 Komarivka, Crimea, village in Krasnohvardiiske Raion

Kharkiv Oblast
 Komarivka, Izium Raion, village in Izium Raion
 Komarivka, Krasnokutsk Raion, village in Krasnokutsk Raion

Khmelnytskyi Oblast
 Komarivka, Khmelnytskyi Oblast, village in Slavuta Raion

Kyiv Oblast
 Komarivka, Kyiv Oblast, village in Makariv Raion

Lviv Oblast
 Komarivka, Lviv Oblast, village in Brody Raion

Odessa Oblast
 Komarivka, Liubashivka Raion, village in Liubashivka Raion
 Komarivka, Velyka Mykhailivka Raion, village in Velyka Mykhailivka Raion

Poltava Oblast
 Komarivka, Poltava Oblast, village in Kobeliaky Raion

Rivne Oblast
 Komarivka, Dubno Raion, village in Dubno Raion
 Komarivka, Kostopil Raion, village in Kostopil Raion

Sumy Oblast
 Komarivka, Hlukhiv Raion, village in Hulukhiv Raion
 Komarivka, Okhtyrka Raion, village in Okhtyrka Raion

Ternopil Oblast
 Komarivka, Berezhany Raion, village in Berezhany Raion
 Komarivka, Kremenets Raion, village in Kremenets Raion
 Komarivka, Monastyryska Raion, village in Monastyryska Raion

Vinnytsia Oblast
 Komarivka, Vinnytsia Oblast, village in Teplyk Raion

Zhytomyr Oblast
 Komarivka, Zhytomyr Oblast, village in Khoroshiv Raion

See also
 Komarówka (disambiguation)